David Mackenzie Ogilvy  (23 June 1911 – 21 July 1999) was a British advertising tycoon, founder of Ogilvy & Mather, and known as the "Father of Advertising". Trained at the Gallup research organisation, he attributed the success of his campaigns to meticulous research into consumer habits. His most famous campaigns include Rolls-Royce, Dove soap, and Hathaway shirts.

Early life (1911–1938)
David Mackenzie Ogilvy was born on 23 June 1911 at West Horsley, Surrey in England. His mother was Dorothy Blew Fairfield, daughter of Arthur Rowan Fairfield, a civil servant from Ireland. His father, Francis John Longley Ogilvy, was a stockbroker.

He was a first cousin once removed of the writer Rebecca West and of Douglas Holden Blew Jones, who was the brother-in-law of Freda Dudley Ward and the father-in-law of Antony Lambton, 6th Earl of Durham. Ogilvy attended St Cyprian's School, Eastbourne, on reduced fees because of his father's straitened circumstances and won a scholarship at age thirteen to Fettes College, in Edinburgh. In 1929, he again won a scholarship, this time in history, to Christ Church, Oxford. He left Oxford after two years, having failed his exams. In 1931, he became a kitchen hand at the Hotel Majestic in Paris. After a year, he returned to Scotland and started selling AGA cooking stoves, door-to-door. His success at this marked him out to his employer, who asked him to write an instruction manual, The Theory and Practice of Selling the AGA Cooker, for the other salesmen. Thirty years later, Fortune magazine editors called it the finest sales instruction manual ever written.

After seeing the manual, Ogilvy's older brother Francis Ogilvy—the father of actor Ian Ogilvy—showed the manual to management at the London advertising agency Mather & Crowther where he was working. They offered the younger Ogilvy a position as an account executive, which he took up in 1935.

At Gallup (1938–1948)
In 1938, Ogilvy persuaded his agency to send him to the United States for a year, where he went to work for George Gallup's Audience Research Institute in New Jersey. Ogilvy cites Gallup as one of the major influences on his thinking, emphasizing meticulous research methods and adherence to reality.

During World War II, Ogilvy worked for the British Intelligence Service at the British embassy in Washington, DC. There he analysed and made recommendations on matters of diplomacy and security. According to a biography produced by Ogilvy & Mather, "he extrapolated his knowledge of human behaviour from consumerism to nationalism in a report which suggested 'applying the Gallup technique to fields of secret intelligence. Eisenhower's Psychological Warfare Board picked up the report and successfully put Ogilvy's suggestions to work in Europe during the last year of the war.

Also during World War II David Ogilvy was a notable alumnus of the secret Camp X, located near the towns of Whitby and Oshawa in Ontario, Canada. According to an article on the camp: "It was there he mastered the power of propaganda before becoming king of Madison Avenue. Although Ogilvy was trained in sabotage and close combat, he was ultimately tasked with projects that included successfully ruining the reputation of businessmen who were supplying the Nazis with industrial materials."

Ogilvy married Sophie Louise Blew Jones. 

After the war, Ogilvy bought a farm in Lancaster County, Pennsylvania, and lived among the Amish. The atmosphere of "serenity, abundance, and contentment" kept Ogilvy and his wife in Pennsylvania for several years, but eventually he admitted his limitations as a farmer and moved to Manhattan.

The Ogilvy & Mather years (1949–1973) 

Having worked as a chef, researcher, and farmer, Ogilvy now started his own advertising agency with the backing of Mather and Crowther, the London agency being run by his elder brother, Francis, which later acquired another London agency, S.H. Benson. The new agency in New York was called Ogilvy, Benson, and Mather. David Ogilvy had just $6,000 ($59,726.72 in 2016 dollars) in his account when he started the agency. He writes in Confessions of an Advertising Man that, initially, he struggled to get clients. Ogilvy also admitted (referring to the pioneer of British advertising Bobby Bevan, the chairman of Benson): "I was in awe of him but Bevan never took notice of me!" They would meet later, however.

Ogilvy & Mather was built on David Ogilvy's principles; in particular, that the function of advertising is to sell and that successful advertising for any product is based on information about its consumer. He disliked advertisements that had loud patronizing voices, and believed a customer should be treated as intelligent. In 1955, he coined the phrase, "The customer is not a moron, she's your wife" based on these values.

His entry into the company of giants started with several iconic advertising campaigns; former First Lady Eleanor Roosevelt did a commercial for Good Luck Margarine in 1959. In his autobiography, Ogilvy on Advertising, he said it had been a mistake to persuade her to do the ad – not because it was undignified, but because he had grown to realize that putting celebs in ads is a mistake.

"The man in the Hathaway shirt" with his aristocratic eye patch which used George Wrangel as model; "The man from Schweppes is here" introduced Commander Edward Whitehead, the elegant bearded Brit, bringing Schweppes (and "Schweppervescence") to the U.S.; a famous headline in the automobile business, "At 60 miles an hour the loudest noise in this new Rolls-Royce comes from the electric clock";

Ogilvy believed that the best way to get new clients was to do notable work for his existing clients. Success in his early campaigns helped Ogilvy get big clients such as Rolls-Royce and Shell. New clients followed and Ogilvy's company grew quickly. He was widely hailed as the "Father of Advertising". In 1962, Time called him "the most sought-after wizard in today's advertising industry". 

In 1973, Ogilvy retired as chairman of Ogilvy & Mather and moved to Touffou, his estate in France. While no longer involved in the agency's day-to-day operations, he stayed in touch with the company. His correspondence so dramatically increased the volume of mail handled in the nearby town of Bonnes that the post office was reclassified at a higher status and the postmaster's salary raised.  The film "The View From Touffou" was made at the estate; in it, Ogilvy recounts his advertising guidelines.

Ogilvy & Mather linked with H.H.D Europe in 1972.

Life with WPP and afterward (1989–1999) 
Ogilvy came out of retirement in the 1980s to serve as chairman of Ogilvy, Benson, & Mather in India. He also spent a year acting as temporary chairman of the agency's German office, commuting weekly between Touffou and Frankfurt. He visited branches of the company around the world, and continued to represent Ogilvy & Mather at
gatherings of clients and business audiences.

In 1989, The Ogilvy Group was bought by WPP Group, a British parent company, for $864 million (US) in a hostile takeover made possible by the fact that the company group had made an IPO as the first company in marketing to do so.

During the takeover procedures, Sir Martin Sorrell, the founder of WPP, was described by Ogilvy as an "odious little shit", and he promised to never work again. (Reports softened it to "odious little jerk", and when Martin Sorrell signed his next company report, he followed the signature with the letters OLJ.) Two events followed simultaneously, however: WPP became the largest marketing communications firm in the world, and David Ogilvy was named the company's non-executive chairman (a position he held for three years). Eventually he became a fan of Sorrell. A letter of apology from Ogilvy adorns Sorrell's office, which is said to be the only apology David Ogilvy ever offered in any form during his adult life. Only a year after his derogatory comments about Sorrell, he was quoted as saying, "When he tried to take over our company, I would liked to have killed him. But it was not legal. I wish I had known him 40 years ago. I like him enormously now."

At age seventy-five, Ogilvy was asked if there was anything he'd always wanted but had somehow eluded him. His reply was, "Knighthood. And a big family - ten children." His only child, David Fairfield Ogilvy, was born during his first marriage, to Melinda Street. That marriage ended in divorce (1955) as did a second marriage to Anne Cabot. Ogilvy married Herta Lans in France during 1973.

Ogilvy was appointed Commander of the Order of British Empire (CBE) in the 1967 Birthday Honours. He was elected to the U.S. Advertising Hall of Fame in 1977 and to France's Order of Arts and Letters in 1990. He chaired the Public Participation Committee for Lincoln Center in Manhattan and served as a member of the Metropolitan Museum of Art's 100th Anniversary Committee. He was appointed Chairman of the United Negro College Fund in 1968, and trustee on the Executive Council of the World Wildlife Fund in 1975. Mr. Ogilvy was inducted into the Junior Achievement Worldwide Global Business Hall of Fame in 1979.

David Ogilvy died on 21 July 1999 at his home, the Château de Touffou, in Bonnes, France.

Works 

Ogilvy authored four books:
  Confessions of an Advertising Man (1963)
  Blood, Brains & Beer: The Autobiography of David Ogilvy (1978)
  Ogilvy on Advertising (1983)
  The Unpublished David Ogilvy (1986)

His book Confessions of an Advertising Man is a book on advertising.  His book Ogilvy on Advertising is a general commentary on advertising.  His book The Unpublished David Ogilvy publishes selections from his private papers.

Ogilvy appears in one film:

  The View From Touffou 

The film was made at his estate Château de Touffou in Bonnes, France.  In the film, he recounts his life in advertising and gives his advice, principles, and guidelines for his advertising campaigns and strategies.

Ogilvy's advertising philosophy followed these four basic principles:
 Creative brilliance: had a strong emphasis on the "BIG IDEA".
 Research: coming, as he did, from a background in research, he never underestimated its importance in advertising. In fact, in 1952, when he opened his own agency, he billed himself as research director.
 Actual results for clients: "In the modern world of business, it is useless to be a creative, original thinker unless you can also sell what you create."
 Professional discipline: "I prefer the discipline of knowledge to the anarchy of ignorance." He codified knowledge into slide and film presentations he called Magic Lanterns. He also instituted several training programs for young advertising professionals.

While Ogilvy was most famous for building and establishing brands, he was primarily interested in direct marketing. He initially built his agency using a direct mail promotion. He ran direct response advertisements in major newspapers to generate leads. In a video titled, "We Sell or Else", he praised direct marketers and direct marketing while pillorying "general" or branding advertising, at one point saying that branding people "worship at the altar of creativity."

Notes

References 
 Ogilvy, D. (1983), Ogilvy on Advertising, John Wiley and Sons, Toronto, 1983  (and Pan Books, London, 1983 ).
 Ogilvy, D. (1963), Confessions of an Advertising Man, Atheneum, Revised edition, 1988, . 
 Terry, Dan'l (1994), "David Ogilvy" in The Ad Men & Women, Edd Applegate, ed., Greenwood, Westport, CT, 1994 
 Roman, Kenneth (2009) The King of Madison Avenue. Palgrave Macmillan. Basingstoke, Hampshire, RG21 6XS, England

Further reading 
 Conant, Jennet The Irregulars: Roald Dahl and the British Spy Ring in Wartime Washington (Simon and Schuster, 2008)

External links 

 
 Ogilvyisms, timeline and classic ads.
 Article by marketer Steve Gibson —contains lengthy excerpt from a speech by Ogilvy
 Video of David Ogilvy reminiscing about George Gallup.
 The Theory and Practice of Selling the Aga Cooker Training Manual.

1911 births
1999 deaths
British advertising executives
Advertising theorists
British copywriters
Anglo-Scots
People educated at Fettes College
People educated at St Cyprian's School
Marketing theorists
British marketing people
Branding theorists
20th-century  British economists
People from Surrey (before 1965)
WPP plc people
Commanders of the Order of the British Empire